Claire Taggart (born 11 February 1995) is a UK Olympic Boccia player and stationer  from Northern Ireland.

Life
Taggart is from Larne in Northern Ireland. She was identified as a BC2 boccia player in 2014.

She was named with David Smith, Nigel Murray and Joshua Rowe as part of the UK's Boccia team. She was 21 when competed at the Rio Paralympics in 2016. No one from Northern Ireland had competed in a Paralympic boccia event before. She would later call her dog Rio.

Taggart runs her own stationery business.

She won a silver medal at the European Championships in Seville in 2019 where she was beaten by Francis Rombouts from Belgium. Taggart was in the three person team with Reegan Stevenson and David Smith that received gold medals. The three of them beat the team from Slovakia 4–3 in the final.  During the COVID-19 pandemic she had to keep fit by training in her hallway for four months.

In January 2020 she was appointed as the accessability officer at Larne F.C.  initially in an advisory role.

In 2022, Taggert secured two gold medals at the Boccia World Cup in Portugal. and later the same year, gold in the Boccia World Championships in Rio. Taggart is supported by the Mary Peters Trust.

References

1995 births
Living people
Sportswomen from Northern Ireland
Boccia players
Boccia players at the 2016 Summer Paralympics
Boccia players at the 2020 Summer Paralympics
People from Larne
Sportspeople from County Antrim
Paralympic athletes of Great Britain
People educated at Larne Grammar School